SK Ran is a Swedish swim team from Malmö, Sweden founded in 1922. The club's greatest rival is Malmö KK, also from Malmö.

Swedish two-times Olympic gold medalist Gunnar Larsson has swum for SK Ran.

Swimmers
Gunnar Larsson
Ida Marko-Varga
Therese Svendsen

External links
SK Ran's official homepage 

Swimming clubs in Sweden
Water polo clubs in Sweden
Sports clubs established in 1922
Sport in Malmö